Villamanrique de la Condesa is a city located in the province of Seville, Spain.

Twin towns
 Saintes-Maries-de-la-Mer, France

References

Municipalities of the Province of Seville